Vizetelly is an anglicized form of the Italian surname Vizzetelli. Notable members of the family were active in journalism and publishing from the late 18th century:
 James Henry Vizetelly (died 1838), London-based publisher
 His sons:
 Henry Vizetelly (1820–1894), publisher and writer
 Frank Vizetelly (born 1830, disappeared 1883), journalist working in France
 Henry's sons:
 Edward Henry Vizetelly (1847–1903), war correspondent
 Ernest Alfred Vizetelly (1853–1922), journalist and author
 Frank Horace Vizetelly (1864–1938), lexicographer

References